The Angola Red Cross (CVA) was founded in 1978.  It has its headquarters in Luanda.

External links
Angola Red Cross Profile

Red Cross and Red Crescent national societies
Medical and health organizations based in Angola
1978 establishments in Angola
Organizations established in 1978
Luanda